Rodel Bryan Generalao Mayol (born August 9, 1981 in Mandaue City, Cebu, Philippines), more commonly known as just Rodel Mayol, is a Filipino former professional boxer and the former WBC Light Flyweight World Champion.

Early life
Mayol is the eldest of five children. At the fifth grade, he once stopped a delinquent, who was 3 years older than he was, with just one punch. He lived with his grandparents for over a decade in Calapayan, Tubod before moving to Mandaue City. He began fighting as an amateur when he was 15 and later won two gold medals at the Palarong Pambansa (National Games). Mayol finally became professional in 2000. When he wasn't boxing, Mayol used to wash cars as well as serving as a ball boy in tennis games.

Professional career
Mayol accumulated a record of 22-0 before losing his first world title bout to WBC minimumweight champion Eagle Den Junlaphan by unanimous decision on May 6, 2006.

On August 4, 2007, Mayol challenged Ulises Solís for the IBF light flyweight title but lost by 8th-round technical knockout. Following the loss to Solis, he fought Adrián Hernández on February 9, 2008 and lost again by 4th-round knockout. On June 13, 2009, he received another shot at a world title against WBO light flyweight champion Iván Calderón. The fight ended in a technical draw after Calderon suffered an accidental headbutt by Mayol. He faced Calderon in a rematch later that year, this time Mayol lost by technical decision after Calderon suffered another unintentional headbutt by Mayol.

On November 21, 2009, he won the WBC light flyweight title by stopping reigning champion Edgar Sosa in two rounds in Mexico. Mayol was docked a point for unintentionally headbutting Sosa in the second round, sending him to the canvas and causing a cut above his cheek. When the action resumed, Mayol dropped Sosa and relentlessly attacked, forcing the referee to stop the fight. Sosa, who required a metal plate to be implanted on his cheekbone due to multiple fractures suffered from the headbutt, filed a protest with the WBC to have the decision changed to a "no contest". However, instead of changing the verdict of the bout in Sosa's favor, the WBC decided to grant the former champion the status of "Champion Emeritus", a position where Sosa will be guaranteed a rematch with Mayol upon recovery or move to the next weight class.

He fought Omar Nino Romero on February 27, 2010, for his first defense of the WBC light flyweight title at the Coliseo Olimpico de la UG in Guadalajara, Jalisco, Mexico. The bout ended with a controversial technical draw after three rounds. Despite receiving a knockdown, Mayol was able to retain his WBC junior flyweight title. Mayol was hit by his opponent with some "low blows.” According to writer Dong Secuya, the referee was going to stop the bout in the 3rd round when Romero fired a hard left that hit the jaw of the momentarily defenseless Mayol who went down almost without consciousness.

On June 19, 2010, Mayol lost his title in a rematch with Romero in San Juan del Rio, Queretaro, Mexico. Mayol had a point deducted in the second round and another point deducted in the fifth round after Romero suffered cuts due to head clashes. Under the WBC's head-clash rule, if a fighter is cut in a clash of heads, the boxer who is not cut automatically has a point taken from his score.

After the loss to Romero, He won 4 straight fights in a row. After the 4th win, He was given a World Title Eliminator. Fighting Julio César Miranda on May 13, 2012 in Ynares Sports Arena, Pasig, Philippines. Mayol sent Miranda to the canvas three times. After 10 rounds, He won the fight by a unanimous decision.

Post-boxing life
After retiring, Mayol started serving as a trainer in Los Angeles where he is currently based.

Professional boxing record

See also
 List of WBC world champions
 List of light flyweight boxing champions

References

External links
 

1981 births
Living people
People from Mandaue
Boxers from Cebu
World boxing champions
World Boxing Council champions
World light-flyweight boxing champions
Filipino male boxers